Celestine Cruz Gonzaga-Soriano (born January 20, 1984), better known as Toni Gonzaga, is a Filipino singer, host, actress, producer, vlogger and entrepreneur. Referred as the country's "Ultimate Multimedia Superstar" by various media outlets, she is the former lead host of long-running reality show, Pinoy Big Brother.

Personal life
Toni Gonzaga was born Celestine Cruz Gonzaga on January 20, 1984, in Taytay, She is the eldest daughter of former punong barangay, councilor and vice mayor Carlito "Bonoy" and Crisanta "Pinty" (née Cruz) Gonzaga, who also acts as her talent manager. Her sister, Catherine "Cathy" Gonzaga, professionally known as Alex Gonzaga, is also an actress, comedian, television host and vlogger. In Taytay, she was an elected Barangay Kagawad for one term and a Sunday school teacher in Taytay United Methodist Church. She studied mass communication at the Dominican College in San Juan for two years. Later, she transferred to the Asian Institute for Distance Education (AIDE) and shifted her major to AB English, which she wasn't able to finish due to her busy showbiz schedule. She is currently enrolled at the University of the Philippines Open University taking up her bachelor's degree in multimedia studies. Gonzaga is an active member of the United Methodist Church.

On February 1, 2015, during her guesting in the Sunday talk show The Buzz, Gonzaga announced her engagement to director Paul Soriano, her boyfriend of eight years. They were married on June 12, 2015, at 3 p.m. in the United Methodist Church in Taytay, Rizal. In February 2016, a source announced that the couple was expecting their first child, due in late 2016 or early 2017. Gonzaga herself confirmed the announcement on ASAP on April 17, 2016. Gonzaga gave birth to their son, Severiano Elliott, on September 30, 2016.

On February 8, 2022, Gonzaga hosted the UniTeam Alliance's proclamation rally in the Philippine Arena and declared her support for former senator Bongbong Marcos in the 2022 presidential elections. Her endorsement attracted widespread media attention, as well as mixed responses from colleagues in the entertainment industry.

Career

1997–2004: Career beginnings
Gonzaga started in local entertainment at the age of 13. It was in 1997 where she joined a singing competition called "Metropop Star Search", which was then aired on GMA. Two other Filipina singers, Kyla and Faith Cuneta, started their career on the singing competition television show. Gonzaga did win the competition.

Gonzaga's biggest break in the entertainment industry was her Sprite TV ad with Piolo Pascual in 2001. In 2002, she released her eponymous debut album under Prime Music and a cover of Gary Valenciano's "Paano" was released as its carrier single. Later that year she became one of the main hosts in the long-time afternoon variety show Eat Bulaga. In 2002, she was cast in the primetime television series Habang Kapiling Ka starring Angelika dela Cruz. In March 2004, she joined Studio 23's Wazzup Wazzup with Archie Alemania and Vhong Navarro. She also sang "Doon", the theme song of TAPE, Inc.'s afternoon TV drama on GMA, Ikaw Sa Puso Ko which starred StarStruck finalist, Nadine Samonte and Oyo Boy Sotto.

2005–2008: Breakthrough with ABS-CBN
In January 2005, Gonzaga transferred to ABS-CBN, and became a host of the Pinoy Big Brother series and the Sunday musical variety program ASAP. In the same year, she starred as a lead in her first comedy-horror film, D' Anothers in which Vhong Navarro was her love interest. In 2006, she released her second album and her first under Star Records entitled Toni: You Complete Me and starred in her first prime time drama series Crazy for You opposite Luis Manzano. Her film You Are the One with Sam Milby was released the same year upon which she was awarded by the Guillermo Mendoza Memorial Foundation, Inc. (GMMSF) the following year for the said film. In 2007, Gonzaga released her third studio album Falling in Love and film You Got Me!. In 2008, she had her first solo major concert at the Aliw Theater titled "Catch Me, Toni Gonzaga: First Major Concert" which had a repeat the same year. After the success of her first major concert, she released her fourth studio album, Love Is.... Later, she launched her fourth film, My Big Love, her third with Sam Milby. After the blockbuster team up of Gonzaga and Milby, she once again starred opposite Vhong Navarro in the film My Only Ü.

2009–2012: Subsequent success
In 2009, Gonzaga starred in a Valentine's Day Special episode of Maalaala Mo Kaya, the longest-running drama anthology on Philippine television and in Asia. She was then cast in the Gideon Flame Film Festival's Best Film, A Journey Home. Later in February, a duet album with Sam Milby was released under Star Records. Before the year ended, Gonzaga was once again teamed up with Sam Milby in the comedy film, Ang Tanging Pamilya: A Marry Go Round which included Ai-Ai de las Alas and Former Philippine President Joseph Estrada as the main leads. In 2010, she became part of entertainment talk show program The Buzz. She is the SM Cinema's Box Office Queen for 2010 alongside John Lloyd Cruz as the Box Office King for their film My Amnesia Girl. Her 5th studio album, All Me, was internationally released in Hong Kong, Taiwan, Malaysia, Singapore, Indonesia, Korea, and Japan.

In August 2011, her film Wedding Tayo, Wedding Hindi, her first ever team up with Eugene Domingo, premiered in cinemas nationwide in the Philippines. On September 30, 2011, she celebrated her 10th anniversary in Philippine entertainment industry with a concert at the Smart Araneta Center titled "Toni@10" with guests Piolo Pascual, John Lloyd Cruz, Vhong Navarro, Pokwang, Vice Ganda, Sam Milby, her real-life sister Alex Gonzaga, with the special participation of Gary Valenciano. TAG Concept, the production and talent management group owned by the Gonzaga family, co-produced the show with Star Events and Epic Entertainment. Furthermore, for the continuation of the celebration, she released her Greatest Hits album in which her singles from 2006 to 2010 were included.

In March 2012, Gonzaga starred in the first ever month-long special of Wansapanataym, which aired four episodes.

The 2011 Female Concert Performer award was given to Gonzaga by the Guillermo Mendoza Memorial Foundation. In October 2012, Gonzaga finally launched her comedy film in which she teamed up with Vice Ganda and Luis Manzano entitled, This Guy's in Love With You, Mare!. The movie is one of the highest grossing Filipino films of all time, earning P315 million when it reached its third week of showing in cinemas nationwide. Moreover, she was awarded Best Female TV Host for her show, ASAP 2012, by the PMPC Star Awards before 2012 ended.

2013–2015: Critical acclaim
On January 7, 2013, Gonzaga entered the Himig Handog P-Pop Love Songs contest with the song entry called "Kahit Na", written by Jumbo "Bojam" De Belen. The contest featured songwriters who worked together with Filipino artists to create new OPM music. The song was simultaneously promoted by Star Records Inc. as it was chosen as one of the 12 Grand Finalists. The music video of the said song was produced by the University of the Philippines. She performed the song during the grand finals on February 24 at the SM Mall of Asia Arena. Overall, the song finished in fifth place as the Best P-pop Love Song, thus rewarding the writer of Gonzaga's song  in cash.

In February 2013, Gonzaga is confirmed one of the main hosts of singing reality show The Voice of the Philippines. As part of the 20th anniversary celebration of Star Cinema, Gonzaga starred with Bea Alonzo, Shaina Magdayao, Angel Locsin and Enchong Dee in Four Sisters and a Wedding, directed by Cathy Garcia-Molina. She also hosted a 10-episode Sunday morning cooking show Kwentong Kusina, Kwentong Buhay, sponsored by San Miguel Pure Foods. On October 8, 2013, Gonzaga won "Best Female Emcee" at the 26th Aliw Awards. In 2014, Gonzaga starred with Piolo Pascual and Iza Calzado in the popular film Starting Over Again and hosted Pinoy Big Brother: All In. She released her sixth studio album called, Celestine. Gonzaga was also a cast member of the Saturday night sitcom Home Sweetie Home with John Lloyd Cruz. Continuing her album promotion, she guested on Myx as a Celebrity MYX VJ for the month of July of that year, and supported by a concert called Celestine Toni Gonzaga held on October 3, 2014 at the Mall of Asia Arena. She then appeared alongside her sister Alex Gonzaga in a reality program called Team Gonzaga, exclusively viewed in ABS-CBN Mobile. Two songs "This Love Is Like" and "Awit ni Ginny" have been released in Myx and YouTube.In 2015, Gonzaga starred in the romantic comedy film, You're My Boss. In April, she renewed her contract with ABS-CBN, and continued her hosting duties in Pinoy Big Brother for the 737 season, which premiered on June 20, 2015.

2016–2021: Final years with ABS-CBN 
In 2016, she was one of the judges for ABS-CBN's original reality show, I Love OPM, where South Korean Yohan Hwang was the winner of the competition. In 2017, Gonzaga also starred in the films Last Night and Mary, Marry Me.

After the departure of John Lloyd Cruz in Home Sweetie Home, Gonzaga remained in the comedy show until its untimely cancellation in 2020, when ABS-CBN ceased its free-to-air broadcast operations as ordered by the National Telecommunications Commission (NTC) and former Solicitor General Jose Calida on May 5, 2020. After the permanent denial of the network's franchise renewal by the Philippine House Committee of 18th Congress in July 2020, Gonzaga lamented the retrenchment of the network's employees although she respected the decision of the Congress. Later on, Gonzaga reprised her Pinoy Big Brother hosting duties for Connect and Kumunity Season 10, the first two seasons of the reality show set in the COVID-19 pandemic and aired on all of ABS-CBN's platforms.

2022–present: Bongbong Marcos era and move to All TV

On February 8, 2022, Gonzaga was the host of the UniTeam Alliance proclamation rally held in the Philippine Arena, a political event that received negative media attention. The next day, February 9, Gonzaga stepped down as the lead host of Pinoy Big Brother after 16 years, passing on her duties to Bianca Gonzalez. News reports have linked her departure to political endorsements, as Gonzaga also declared her support for Iglesia ni Cristo (INC) member and former senatorial candidate Rodante Marcoleta, one of the key figures in the shutdown of ABS-CBN and the denial of its franchise renewal. ABS-CBN respected the decision of Gonzaga's resignation from Pinoy Big Brother and her departure from the network.

On June 30, 2022, the day of inauguration of President Bongbong Marcos, Gonzaga performed the Filipino national anthem, "Lupang Hinirang". She later became an official endorser of Shopee, which garnered negative reactions online amid the company's plans to lay-off employees.

In September 2022, Gonzaga, together with her husband, moved to AMBS (All TV), a new television network owned by Manny Villar. Gonzaga later interviewed Bongbong Marcos inside the Malacañang Palace, which aired on September 13 on All TV and streamed via her YouTube's Toni Talks. A weekday afternoon talk show called Toni, hosted and produced by herself, premiered on All TV on October 3, 2022. She also starred in the 2022 Metro Manila Film Festival entry, My Teacher''. On November 18, 2022, Gonzaga announced a concert that will belatedly celebrate her 20th anniversary in show business at the Araneta Coliseum on January 20, 2023.

Filmography

Discography

Studio albums

Compilation albums

Participated albums

Concerts

Awards and nominations

References

External links

1984 births
Living people
Filipino child actresses
Filipino television presenters
Filipino child singers
Contraltos
English-language singers from the Philippines
Filipino Protestants
Filipino United Methodists
Actresses from Rizal
Singers from Rizal
Filipino film actresses
Filipino television actresses
Filipino women comedians
GMA Network personalities
Star Magic
ABS-CBN personalities
Star Music artists
University of the Philippines Open University alumni
20th-century Filipino actresses
21st-century Filipino actresses
21st-century Filipino women singers
Filipino women pop singers
Filipino women television presenters
Filipino YouTubers